Gindari: Bahubuthayo 2 ( 2) is a 2015 Sinhalese comedy mystery film. The film served as a sequel to the 2001 film Bahubuthayo,  which was written and directed and produced by Udayakantha Warnasuriya. It stars Rodney Warnakula, Mahendra Perera and Paboda Sandeepani in lead roles along with Richerd Manamudali and Sriyantha Mendis. Music composed by Ananda Perera. It is the 1225th Sri Lankan film in the Sinhala cinema.

Scenes in the film were shot in and around the towns of Anuradhapura and Colombo, Sri Lanka.

Plot
Following up to events from the earlier film, Bahubuthayo, Lanti and Bunty are working as journalists. Tikiri, an evil spirit, comes looking for Lanti and Bunty. The three end up living together while Tikiri does their work.

After the publication of a misleading news item relating to a minister, the minister comes to the house where Bunty and Lanti live and beats them. The minister thinks Tikiri is beautiful, and takes her by force to work in his ministry office. He changes Tikiri's name as Tikri and falls with her. Due to parental pressure, Bunty soon marries a girl named Malkanthi. He discovers he is not well matched with his wife and they frequently quarrel until Malkanthi leaves him.

Meanwhile, Tikiri rejects advances from the minister and returns to the house where Bunty and Lanty live. From there, further problems develop as the journalists must discover what it will take to get rid of the she-devil in their home.

Cast
 Paboda Sandeepani as Tikiri aka Tikri 
 Mahendra Perera as Lanti
 Rodney Warnakula as Bunty
 Richerd Manamudali as Chaminda
 Sriyantha Mendis as Minister Edwin Balachandra
 Lochana Imashi as Malkanthi
 Susila Kottage as Bunty's mother
 Ariyasena Gamage as Bunty's father
 Ravindra Yasas as Secretary Ari
 Manike Attanayake as Minister's wife
 Boniface Jayasantha as Chief monk
 Anura Bandara Rajaguru as Devil master
 Rathna Sumanapala as Malkanthi's mother
 Sarath Chandrasiri as Malkanthi's drunken uncle
 Chathura Perera as Minister security guard
 Lucky Dias as himself
 Roshan Ranawana as Cameo Role
 Udari Warnakulasooriya as Cameo Role
 Bindu Bothalegama as Room boy
 Jeevan Handunetti as Pub servant
 Saman Almeida as Minister security guard
 Shiromika Fernando as Sales woman
 Damitha Saluwadana as woman at picatin

Release
The film was released in April 2015. The film reached 100 days to August 2015.

Song

References

External links
ගින්දරී දර්ශන තලයේ රසමුසු, බියකරු තැන්
ගින්දරී කොළඹ අවට සැරිසරයි

2015 films
2010s Sinhala-language films
2010s comedy mystery films
Sri Lankan comedy films
2015 comedy films
Films directed by Udayakantha Warnasuriya